The siege of Ganja took place in 1606 during the Ottoman–Safavid War of 1603–1618. The Safavids had lost the city to the Ottomans by the Treaty of Constantinople of 1590. Three months after the victorious Battle of Sufiyan (1605), Safavid king (shah) Abbas I of Persia (1588–1629) invested Ganja, and reconquered it after a six-month siege. After Ganja was recaptured, Abbas I and his men proceeded to Tiflis (Tbilisi), retaking control of the city in the same year.

References

Sources
 
 
 

Ottoman–Persian Wars
1606 in the Ottoman Empire
1606 in Iran
Ganja
Ganja
Ganja
History of Ganja, Azerbaijan